The Gay class were a class of twelve fast patrol boats that served with the Royal Navy from the early 1950s. All were named after types of soldiers or military or related figures, prefixed with 'Gay'. The class could be fitted as either motor gun boats or motor torpedo boats, depending on the type of armament they carried.

Design
They were developments of the MTB 538/539 class that had served during the Second World War, and were intended to be an interim measure until the diesel-powered s could be introduced. The Gays were the last petrol powered warships to be built for the Royal Navy. Those fitted as Motor Torpedo Boats received two  guns and two  torpedoes, while those classified as Motor Gun Boats received a single  gun and a 40 mm gun.

Construction
The class was ordered between February and May 1951 from a number of shipyards across Britain, many of whom had built similar ships for the navy during the Second World War. Four were built by Vosper & Company, two by Thornycroft, two by Morgan Giles, of Teignmouth, two by Taylor, of Chertsey and two by McGruer & Co Ltd, of Clynder. They were launched between 1952 and 1954, with the last of the class, being launched in March 1954.

Careers
Most of the vessels served for a decade before being retired and sold off, though the longest-lived, was only sold off in 1971, after nearly 20 years in service.  She had been a High Speed Target Towing vessel at HMNB Devonport since 1959, until being put into reserve in 1964. HMS Gay Charger was commanded by Nigel Lawson during his National Service.   appeared as 1087 in The Ship That Died of Shame, a film based on a book by Nicholas Monsarrat and starring Richard Attenborough.  became a target vessel and was sunk off Portland in 1968, while  was damaged while being delivered to the Navy, and then damaged when a vessel she was moored next to exploded. She then struck a submerged boom and nearly sank off Southsea Pier. She was sold out of the navy in 1963, but survived to be restored as the only remaining member of her class.

Ships

During the Second World War the Royal Navy also sailed HMS Gay Viking and HMS Gay Corsair, a pair of motor gun boats. These were superficially similar to the later Gay-class, although their primary armament was a mixture of QF 6-pounder Hotchkiss, Oerlikon 20 mm cannon, and depth charges. Both had left service by the top of the Gay-class' introduction.

Notes

References

 

 
Patrol boat classes
Ship classes of the Royal Navy